The Arrows A10 was a Formula One car used by the Arrows team  to compete in the  and  Formula One seasons. The car was designed by Ross Brawn and was upgraded slightly in 1988, racing as A10B.

1987
The engines were serviced by the team's long time engine tuner Heini Mader from Switzerland, the former mechanic of Jo Siffert.

For 1987 the engines were fitted with a FIA approved pop-off valve which was mandatory for all turbo engines in the season with turbo boost restricted to 4.0 bar (previously turbo boost was restricted only by what the engineers felt the engines could handle, though most, including the BMW M12, usually went no further than 5.6 Bar). During the season the team continually experienced problems with the pop-off valve cutting in well below the 4.0 Bar limit in both qualifying and races, with Warwick reporting at the opening race in Brazil that the valve was restricting boost to 3.5 Bar, and sometimes it was cutting in at 2.6 Bar (a loss of around ), a situation that didn't improve throughout the season. Without the resources and financial backing available to the likes of Ferrari or Honda, it would take Mader until the three quarters of the way through the  season to solve the problem.

In 1987 the team improved from its 10th place in 1986 to finish in 7th place in 1987. Englishman Derek Warwick scored 3 points for the year with a 5th in the British Grand Prix, and 6th in Hungary, while his American teammate Eddie Cheever managed to score 8 points from a 4th in Belgium, 6th in Detroit and Portugal and another 4th in Mexico, in what was his comeback year after missing most of the  season when racing Sportscars for Tom Walkinshaw Racing's Silk Cut Jaguar team. His only Formula One race in 1986 was in Detroit for the Haas Lola team.

The car scored 11 points for the season leaving them in 7th place in the Constructors' Championship.

1988
Arrows continued with the Megatron turbos and finished 5th in the 1988 Constructors' Championship and Eddie Cheever scored the A10's only podium finish with a 3rd placing at the 1988 Italian Grand Prix. Warwick also finished 4th in that race, only 0.582 seconds behind Cheever, in a great result for the team. Warwick finished 8th in the Drivers' Championship with 17 points while Cheever scored 6 points to finish 12th.

The turbos were also restricted to just 150 litres of fuel per race in 1988, while the 'atmo' cars were limited only to what the car designers deemed necessary (the Benetton B188 allegedly had the largest fuel tank at 215 litres). The FIA mandated pop-off valve had a habit of cutting in well before the 2.5 bar limit, which restricted power and often left the cars with plenty of fuel to spare at the end of a race (the team had experienced exactly the same problem in 1987). Quite often the pop-off valve cut in at 2.3 bar or below in both qualifying and races (F1 engineers estimated that each 0.1 bar was worth approximately 20 bhp) leaving Warwick and Cheever with a hard time fighting off the atmos of Benetton, Williams and March, let alone challenging the other leading turbo teams: McLaren-Honda (who won 15 of the 16 races in 1988), Ferrari (who won the race that McLaren did not) and Lotus-Honda.

It took until just before the Italian Grand Prix for Heini Mader to get on top of the pop-off valve problem, which turned out to be the FIA unit being located too high above the engine, resulting in less power, a problem that Honda and Ferrari engineers had long since solved thanks to the resources available to them from their respective factories. By moving the valve closer to the engine, Mader had allowed Warwick and Cheever to finally exploit the raw power of the straight 4 turbo and to be much closer to the front than they had been all season. However, while the pop-off valve issue was finally fixed, the engine's other main problem that had remained since the 4-cylinder BMW had first appeared in F1 back in  still remained, lack of throttle response from turbo lag followed by the power coming on like a light switch. This hampered the team in the final four races of the season, especially at the Spanish Grand Prix held at the tight Circuito de Jerez where the cars are constantly on and off the throttle over the course of a lap and good throttle response counts for more than outright top speed. Warwick could only qualify 17th at Jerez while Cheever started on the back row of the grid in 25th, his worst qualifying performance since he failed to qualify for the 1984 Monaco Grand Prix in a turbocharged V8 Alfa Romeo.

Despite this Cheever, who qualified the faster of the two drivers in 5th place (Warwick was 6th, only 0.155 slower), was still 1.686 seconds slower than pole man Ayrton Senna (McLaren). The main difference being the downforce of the McLarens as well as the superior acceleration of the Honda V6. This was a considerable improvement for the team who had been some 5.8 seconds slower (Warwick) than the McLarens just three races earlier at Hockenheim in Germany.

During qualifying for the German Grand Prix, Eddie Cheever, on a quick lap, had a close call at almost  on the straight before the circuit's "Stadium" section. On a hot lap, Cheever moved to his left to pass the Eurobrun of Oscar Larrauri, while Ferrari's Gerhard Berger was on his own hot lap and was attempting to pass them both, the problem being Cheever had what was left of the road. Berger put two wheels on the grass which threw his car into a wild spin back across the track and directly between the Arrows and EuroBrun, just missing taking both cars and himself out in a high-speed crash (luckily the Ferrari did not hit the armco and was able to drive away).

Complete Formula One results
(key)

References

A10